Celeste Pin (born 25 April 1961 in Colle Umberto) is an Italian former professional footballer who played as a defender.

References

External links
Profile at Lega-Calcio.it

1961 births
Living people
Italian footballers
Italy under-21 international footballers
Association football defenders
Serie A players
Serie B players
A.C. Perugia Calcio players
ACF Fiorentina players
Hellas Verona F.C. players
A.C.N. Siena 1904 players